There have been several outbreaks of Nipah virus in Kerala, some of which have been traced to fruit bats.

History
Following previous Nipah virus outbreaks in India in 2001 and 2007 (both in the eastern state West Bengal), an outbreak occurred in Kerala in 2018.  The 2018 Kerala outbreak was traced to fruit bats in the area and was generally confined to Kozhikode and Malappuram districts, and claimed 17 lives. The outbreak was declared over on 10 June 2018. A subsequent outbreak occurred in 2021 but was confined to the Pazhur village located within the Chathamangalam Gram panchayat in the Kozhikode district of Kerala. The outbreak claimed one life before it was declared over on 5 September 2021.

2018 outbreak

Timeline
The index case of the outbreak was reported at sub-divisional hospital in Perambra in Kozhikode district on 2 May. This patient—was later taken to the Government Medical College, Kozhikode for further treatment, where he later succumbed to the virus. Later, his brother Mohammed Salih was admitted to Baby Memorial Hospital, Kozhikode, with suspected viral encephalitis. A team of doctors at Baby Memorial Hospital, Kozhikode suspected Nipah, as the symptoms were similar to that of his brother who had died by then. The samples were tested at the Manipal Institute of Virology where it was confirmed as a case of Nipah; samples were also tested positive at National Institute of Virology, Pune.

The index patient had passed the virus to 16 persons at Medical College Hospital; later two more were infected, increasing the total count of infected to 18. There were 10 deaths in the first week, including a nurse named Lini Puthussery who treated the index patient before diagnosis. The outbreak began in Kozhikode district and later spread to the adjoining Malappuram district. Health advisories were issued for Northern Kerala as well as the adjoining districts of Karnataka, with two suspected cases detected in Mangalore on 23 May 2018.

Over 2,000 people in Kozhikode and Malappuram districts were quarantined and kept under observation during the period of the outbreak. To fight the outbreak, M 102.4—a human monoclonal antibody for which clinical trials are still going on—was imported from Australia. This was facilitated by renowned Nipah researcher Christopher Broder. The outbreak also lead to the revival of World Health Organization's Nipah Drug Trials Group, led by Soumya Swaminathan.

A new case of a 23-year-old student was detected again on 4 June 2019 in Kochi. Over 300 people were put under observation, but no further cases were reported. The student later recovered. This is the fourth occurrence reported in India, with previous ones having occurred in 2001 (45 deaths), 2007 (5 deaths), and 2018 (17 deaths).

After Sabith, 16 of the affected patients succumbed to the disease and two patients recovered fully. The outbreak was officially declared over on 10 June 2018.

Virology and epidemiology
The presence of the Nipah virus in patients was confirmed from RT-PCR tests conducted at the Manipal Institute of Virology and the National Virology Institute, Pune.

Though the first set of samples did not detect the virus in bats, later tests proved that fruit bats in the area were the source of the virus.

Response 
On 23 May 2018, Kerala Health Department issued a travel advisory asking travelers to the Northern districts of Kerala to be extra cautious.

On 23 May 2018, State of Kerala, requesting medical advisory from Malaysian Health Department (Kementerian Kesihatan  Malaysia), for treatment and medicines for Nipah virus.

On 25 May 2018, sharing of Information of Virus was posted in the WHO EIS at Malaysian Time. On the same day, the Ministry of Health and Prevention of the United Arab Emirates advised postponing unnecessary travel to Kerala and avoiding its fruits and vegetables until the situation was under control.

On 30 May 2018 construction began on the Institute of Advanced Virology, Kerala, which was founded in response to the outbreak.

On 1 June 2018, Thamarassery diocese in northern Kerala urged churches to stop giving Communion on the tongue, to postpone religious classes, and to avoid weddings and family get-togethers and unnecessary travel until the virus spread was contained.

Recognition 
Kerala's efforts in containing the outbreak under the leadership of the Health Minister K. K. Shailaja and the Health Secretary Rajeev Sadanandan and the then district collector were lauded by many, including the Kerala High Court and Robert Gallo of the Institute of Human Virology, Baltimore.

Kerala Government gave early increments to 61 people to reward them for their efforts in tackling this outbreak: 4 assistant professors, 19 staff nurses, 7 nursing assistants, 17 cleaning staff, 4 hospital attenders, 2 health inspectors, 4 security staff, 1 plumber, and 3 lab technicians. Twelve junior residents and two senior residents were also awarded gold medals of one sovereign each.

Lini Puthussery, a  28 year old nurse at the Perambra Taluk hospital who fell victim to Nipah was hailed on social media and by doctors as a hero for her sacrifice. A note she had written addressed to her husband Sajish was widely circulated on social media. Kerala Government Hospital Development Society (KGHDS) employees union instituted an award in Puthussery's name to an outstanding person in the sector. The "Best Nurse in Public Service Award" was instituted in memory of Puthussery. Jim Campbell, the Director of the Health Workforce of World Health Organisation also paid tribute, tweeting "Remember them, lest we forget: Razan al-Najjar (Gaza); Lini Puthusserry (India),  Salome Karwah (Liberia)".

Following the outbreak, the government modernized its only virology lab in Alappuzha and decided to establish more virology institutes in the state.

2021 Outbreak

Timeline
The 2021 Kerala Nipah virus outbreak started with the death of a 12-year-old boy in Pazhur, Kozhikode. The outbreak was localized in the Pazhur village located within the Chathamangalam Gram panchayat in the Kozhikode district of Kerala, and it claimed one life. The outbreak was contained and declared over on 5 September 2021. This was the third Nipah virus outbreak in Kerala, the earlier being in 2018 and 2019. The Central Government has rushed a team of the National Centre for Disease Control to the state, which will provide technical support. Relatives of the dead boy and all those involved in his treatment have been put under quarantine.

The index case of the outbreak was reported at a private hospital in Kozhikode on 5 September 2021, a 12-year-old boy from Chathamangalam, in the Kozhikode district of Kerala, who died after testing positive for a Nipah virus infection. The report of this new Nipah infection, which spreads through saliva of fruit bats, comes three years after a previous outbreak that had claimed 17 lives in the state. Following the death of Nipa, the Chathamangamalam Grama Panchayat and the adjoining areas were placed under strict control by the Health Department and the Police. Those in close contact with the child were placed in isolation. and all of them had a negative test result.

Virology and epidemiology 
The presence of the Nipah virus in the patient was confirmed by RT-PCR tests; all three samples collected from the child (plasma, serum and CSF) were found to be positive in tests done at the National Institute of Virology Pune.

In popular culture 
Virus, a 2019 Indian Malayalam medical thriller film co-produced and directed by Aashiq Abu, released on 7 June 2019 was based on 2018 Kerala Nipah virus outbreak.

References

External links
 Respond ReplyTicket from Malaysian Ministry of Health (Kementrian Kesihatan Malaysia) 
 Sharing of Information of Virus Posted in the WHO EIS on at Malaysian Time 
 
 

2018 disasters in India
2018 disease outbreaks
May 2018 events in India
June 2018 events in India
Disease outbreaks in India
21st-century epidemics
Paramyxoviridae
Health in Kerala
2010s in Kerala
Disasters in Kerala
History of Kerala (1947–present)